Nicola Torriani was a 17th-century Italian architect. He was the brother of the architect and sculptor Orazio Torriani.  His works include the lower part (and possibly also the upper part) of Santi Domenico e Sisto.

Architects from Rome
17th-century Italian architects